Scandal in Bad Ischl (German: Skandal in Ischl) is a 1957 Austrian historical comedy film directed by Rolf Thiele and starring O.W. Fischer, Elisabeth Müller and Ivan Desny. The film takes place in 1910 in the spa town of Bad Ischl.

The film's sets were designed by the art director Felix Smetana. It was shot in Agfacolor.

Cast
 O.W. Fischer as Dr. Franz Duhr  
 Elisabeth Müller as Viola Duhr  
 Ivan Desny as Graf Vanin  
 Nina Sandt as Marquise de Laforge  
 Doris Kirchner as Ida, Sprechstundenhilfe  
 Harry Meyen as Dr. Balsam, Assistenzarzt  
 Michael Ande as Prinz Franz  
 Alma Seidler as Erzherzogin Marie Antonie 
 Raoul Retzer as Podlasni  
 Senta Wengraf as Gräfin Ens  
 Egon von Jordan 
 Elisabeth Stiepl
 Edith Elmay as Mizzi  
 Guido Wieland as Medizinalrat Duhr  
 Carola Rasch as Komtesse Nina  
 Hugo Lindinger as Bürgermeister  
 Christl Erber as Therese Holzapfel 
 Fritz Holzer as Redakteur Wieslinger  
 Lutz Landers as Baron Bruno von Waldeck  
 Helmut Lex as Leutnant Willi von Waldeck  
 Rudolf Forster as Fürst Emanuel 
 Susanne Engelhart as Julia, seine Frau  
 Lorli Fischer as Rosi  
 Willi Meissl-Berling as Dr. Hoffmann  
 Karl Schellenberg as Dr. Swoboda

References

Bibliography 
 Robert Dassanowsky. Austrian Cinema. McFarland & Co, 2005.

External links 
 

1957 films
Austrian historical comedy films
1950s historical comedy films
1950s German-language films
Films directed by Rolf Thiele
Films set in the 1910s